The 1923–24 Swiss National Ice Hockey Championship was the 14th edition of the national ice hockey championship in Switzerland. HC Rosey Gstaad won the championship as EHC St. Moritz forfeited the final.

First round

Eastern Series 
 EHC St. Moritz - HC Davos 4:3 OT

EHC St. Moritz qualified for the final.

Western Series 
 HC Château-d’Œx - HC Rosey Gstaad 3:7

HC Rosey Gstaad qualified for the final.

Final 
 EHC St. Moritz - HC Rosey Gstaad 0:3 Forfeit

External links 
Swiss Ice Hockey Federation – All-time results

National
Swiss National Ice Hockey Championship seasons